Senator Bullock may refer to:

Alexander Bullock (1816–1882), Massachusetts State Senate
Edward Bullock (1822–1861), Alabama State Senate
J. Russell Bullock (1815–1899), Rhode Island State Senate
Marshall Bullock (fl. 2010s), Michigan State Senate
Wingfield Bullock (died 1821), Kentucky State Senate

See also
John Bulloch (politician) (born 1947), Georgia State Senate
William Bellinger Bulloch (1777–1852), U.S. Senator from Georgia